Luis Juniti Shinohara (born August 29, 1954) is a retired judoka from Brazil, who won a total number of three medals at the Pan American Games during his career. He also competed at the 1980 Summer Olympics and the 1984 Summer Olympics.

He coaches Olympic medalist judoka Felipe Kitadai.  His father is Brazilian-Japanese Judo pioneer, Massao Shinohara.

References

External links
 

Brazilian people of Japanese descent
1954 births
Living people
Place of birth missing (living people)
Brazilian male judoka
Pan American Games gold medalists for Brazil
Pan American Games silver medalists for Brazil
Pan American Games bronze medalists for Brazil
Pan American Games medalists in judo
Olympic judoka of Brazil
Judoka at the 1980 Summer Olympics
Judoka at the 1984 Summer Olympics
Judoka at the 1975 Pan American Games
Judoka at the 1979 Pan American Games
Judoka at the 1983 Pan American Games
Medalists at the 1975 Pan American Games
Medalists at the 1979 Pan American Games